Coulter is a surname of Scottish and Irish origin.

Coulter most likely first originated as a toponymic surname in Scotland among people from areas around Coulter in South Lanarkshire or Maryculter and Peterculter in Aberdeenshire.  The etymological origins of these place names may be from Scottish Gaelic cùl tir, meaning 'back land', or (at least in the case of the Lanarkshire village) from a distortion of the Scots language Cootyre, meaning a safe place to store cows.  

After the Plantation of Ulster when people with the surname migrated from Scotland to the northernmost province of Ireland, the Irish surname Uí Coltarain, meaning "descendants of Coltarain", appears to have been anglicised to Coulter. The Uí Coltarain were chiefs of the petty-kingdom of Dál Coirbin (within what became the barony of Castlereagh), in the over-kingdom of Ulaid.

Notable people

 Allen Coulter, American director
 Ann Coulter, American author and conservative political commentator
 Ashley Coulter, Canadian singer
 Catherine Coulter, American novelist
 Cornelia C. Coulter (1885-1960), Professor of Latin at Mount Holyoke College
 Dan Coulter, Canadian MLA from British Columbia
 David Coulter (banker) (born 1949), director of Warburg Pincus
 David Coulter (politician), Democratic Party politician and mayor of Ferndale, Michigan
 David Coulter (minister) (born 1957), Church of Scotland minister and RAF chaplain
 David Coulter (karateka), Scottish martial artist
 Declan Coulter, Irish hurler
 E. Merton Coulter, American historian
 Isaiah Coulter (born 1998), American football player
 James Coulter (financier), co-founder of private equity firm TPG Capital
 Jeanelle Coulter, First Lady of North Carolina
 Joey Coulter, race car driver
 John Coulter (politician), Australian politician
 John B. Coulter, American general during the Korean War
 John Merle Coulter, American botanist, brother of Stanley Coulter
 Joseph Coulter, Archdeacon
 Michael Coulter (born 1952), Scottish cinematographer 
 Phil Coulter (born 1942), Irish musician
 Philip B. Coulter (born 1939; Philip Brooks Coulter), American political scientist and professor emeritus (Prof. em.) of political science (lastly at the University of New Orleans/UNO)
 Richard Coulter (US politician), United States Congressman
 Richard Coulter (general), American Civil War general
 Ricki-Lee Coulter, Australian singer
 Robert Coulter, Northern Irish politician
 Shannon Coulter, founder of #GrabYourWallet consumers-vs-Trump group
 Stanley Coulter, American botanist, brother of John Merle Coulter
 Tex Coulter, Canadian football player
 Thomas Coulter, Irish physician, botanist, and explorer
 Wallace H. Coulter, American inventor and entrepreneur (brother of Joseph Coulter)
 Walter Coulter (1891–1917), Scottish footballer
 William A. Coulter (1849–1936), American marine painter

Fictional characters:
 Eric Coulter, character in Veronica Roth's Divergent trilogy.
 Marisa Coulter, character in Philip Pullman's His Dark Materials trilogy

Places
 In Canada:
Coulterville, Ontario
 In the United Kingdom:
Coulter, South Lanarkshire
In the United States:
Coulter, Iowa
Coulterville, California
Coulterville, Illinois
Coulterville, Pennsylvania
Coulterville, Sale Creek, Tennessee
Coulter Creek, Washington

See also
Beckman Coulter,  company 
Coulter (agriculture)
Coulter counter
 Plant taxa:
Coulter's Lupine
Coulter's Matilija poppy
Coulter pine
Coulter's sage
Recipients of the Legion of Merit#Legionnary, three awards to two people bearing the name

References

Surnames
Surnames of Ulster-Scottish origin
Irish royal families
Surnames of Irish origin
Surnames of Scottish origin
Scottish surnames
Surnames of British Isles origin